Outcast (trademarked as Outcast by Kirkman and Azaceta)  is an American comic book series created by writer Robert Kirkman and artist Paul Azaceta.

It is a supernatural horror story that chronicles Kyle Barnes, a man whose loved ones have been involved in demonic possession since his childhood. With the help of a clergyman, he tries as an adult to unveil what lies behind the supernatural manifestations and why he seems to carry special peculiarities.

The first issue of the monthly comic was published in 2014 by Image Comics. The series ran for a total of 48 issues until its completion in April 2021.

Before the first release, Kirkman also began to develop a television adaptation with Cinemax which began airing in June 2016 and ended in 2018 after two seasons.

Publication history 
Outcast was officially announced in October 2013 at New York Comic Con, after two years of development. Kirkman said it was the first time that he already had a clear ending in mind when he began to write the comic book. He described Outcast as an epic horror story, hoping to give real scares to readers, unlike The Walking Dead style. Kirkman said that orders for the first issue were higher than for the most recent issue of The Walking Dead.

Issues 
 A Darkness Surrounds Him, June 25, 2014
 From The Shadows It Watches, July 30, 2014 
 I Remember When She Loved Me, August 27, 2014
 To Light Our Way, September 24, 2014
 A Wrath Unseen, November 12, 2014
 Receive Your Mark, December 24, 2014
 The Road Before Us, March 18, 2015
 A Vast and Unending Ruin, April 29, 2015
 What Lurks Within, May 27, 2015
 A Weakness Exposed, July 1, 2015
 A Line is Crossed, August 5, 2015
 Close to Home, September 9, 2015
 This Little Light, November 25, 2015
 Get Behind Me Satan, December 16, 2015
 All Alone Now, January 27, 2016
 Overwhelmed, February 24, 2016
 The Damage Done, March 23, 2016
 There is No Escape, April 27, 2016
 Under Devil's Wing, July 27, 2016
 A Power Exposed, August 24, 2016
 Blood is Spilled, September 28, 2016
 The Ticking Clock, October 26, 2016
 The Darkest Before, November 23, 2016
 No Turning Back, January 11, 2017
 Light of Day, February 22, 2017
 The Sharpened Edge, March 29, 2017
 A New Way, May 3, 2017
 His Growing Flock, June 7, 2017
 Unwelcomed, July 26, 2017 
 A Coming Storm, September 6, 2017
 Homelife, October 25, 2017
 Invasion (Part 1 of 5), December 27, 2017
 Invasion (Part 2 of 5), January 31, 2018
 Invasion (Part 3 of 5), March 21, 2018
 Invasion (Part 4 of 5), May 9, 2018
 Invasion (Part 5 of 5), June 27, 2018
 A Father's Love, December 19, 2018
 Surrounded, January 23, 2019
 Infiltration, February 27, 2019
 The Darkness Grows, March 27, 2019
 Betrayed, May 1, 2019
 Shining Too Brightly, August 7, 2019
 The Merged, December 25, 2019
 The Merged Part 2, January 29, 2020
 The Merged Part 3, May 20, 2020
 The Merged Part 4, September 16, 2020
 The Merged Part 5, December 23, 2020
 The Merged Part 6, April 28, 2021

Collected editions

Television adaptation 

Cinemax picked up the rights to produce a show based on the comic in 2013. Ten episodes were announced to be produced with Patrick Fugit (Kyle Barnes) and Philip Glenister (Reverend Anderson) as the leading roles for the television series, which premiered in June 2016.

Reception
The first issue of the comic was released in June 2014 to positive reviews.

References

External links

Outcast by Kirkman & Azaceta series page from Image Comics

2014 comics debuts
Comics by Robert Kirkman
Comics adapted into television series
Skybound Entertainment titles